is a Japanese transportation/tourism company based in Hiroshima, Japan.

Sightseeing boats
Miyajima the 3rd pier - off Itsukushima Shrine - the 3rd pier
Hiroshima Peace Memorial Park - Miyajima
River cruise

External links
 AQUA NET HIROSHIMA

Companies based in Hiroshima
Transport in Hiroshima
Ferry companies of Japan